Roy Pistoor (born 4 March 1990) is a Dutch football player who plays for ASV De Dijk on loan from Almere City FC.

Club career
He made his professional debut in the Eerste Divisie for FC Volendam on 22 October 2012 in a game against Sparta Rotterdam.

References

External links
 
 

1990 births
Sportspeople from Alkmaar
Living people
Dutch footballers
FC Volendam players
Eerste Divisie players
Almere City FC players
ASV De Dijk players
Association football goalkeepers
AFC '34 players
Footballers from North Holland